Dame-Marie Airport is an airstrip that serves Dame-Marie, a coastal town and commune in the Grand'Anse Department of Haiti.

Mission Aviation Fellowship (MAF) flies into Dame-Marie once a month from Jérémie.

See also
Transport in Haiti
List of airports in Haiti

References

External links
OpenStreetMap - Dame-Marie
MAF charter air service

Airports in Haiti
Grand'Anse (department)